Gagi may refer to:

People
 Gagi Bazadze (born 1992), Georgian rugby player

Places
 Gagi, India
 Gagi Fortress, Georgia